The South Atlantic League of Minor League Baseball is one of three High-A baseball leagues in the United States. A league champion is determined at the end of each season. Champions have been determined by postseason playoffs, winning the regular season pennant, or being declared champion by the league office. For 2019, the first- and second-half winners within each division, Northern and Southern, met in a best-of-three series to determine division champions. Then, the North and South division winners played a best-of-five series to determine a league champion. As of 2022, the winners of each division from both the first and second halves of the season meet in a best-of-three division series, with the winners of the two division series meeting in a best-of-three championship series.

League champions

Championship wins by team
Active South Atlantic League teams appear in bold.

Notes
 Asheville and Lexington were declared co-champions after the playoffs were cancelled in the wake the September 11 terrorist attacks.

References

C
South Atlantic
South Atlantic League champions
South Atlantic League